Devi Singh (born 1926) is an Indian wrestler. He competed in the men's freestyle welterweight at the 1956 Summer Olympics.

References

External links
 

1926 births
Possibly living people
Indian male sport wrestlers
Olympic wrestlers of India
Wrestlers at the 1956 Summer Olympics
Place of birth missing